Route 396, or Highway 396, may refer to:

Canada
Manitoba Provincial Road 396
Saskatchewan Highway 396 (former)

Japan
 Japan National Route 396

United States
  Arkansas Highway 396 (former)
  Maryland Route 396
 Maryland Route 396A
  Nevada State Route 396
 New York:
  New York State Route 396
  County Route 396 (Erie County, New York)
  Puerto Rico Highway 396
  Tennessee State Route 396
 Texas:
  Texas State Highway Loop 396
  Farm to Market Road 396
 Urban Road 396
  Virginia State Route 396